Fitzgerald Stream is a stream between Fitzgerald Hill and Inclusion Hill on the lower ice-free west slopes of Mount Bird, Ross Island, flowing to McMurdo Sound across McDonald Beach. It was explored by the New Zealand Geological Survey Antarctic Expedition, 1958–59, and named by the New Zealand Antarctic Place-Names Committee for E.B. Fitzgerald, deputy leader of the expedition.

References 

Rivers of the Ross Dependency
Landforms of Ross Island